Miss Leelavathi is a 1965 Indian Kannada language film directed by M. R. Vittal and written by Korati Srinivasa Rao. It stars Jayanthi as the protagonist, along with Udaykumar, K. S. Ashwath, Ramesh and others. The film won the National Award for second best film in Kannada.

The film was talked about for its bold portrayal of women and was accredited of being the first Kannada feature film showing the leading lady wearing a swimsuit. The film was a musical hit with R. Sudarsanam as the composer.

Cast
 Jayanthi as Leelavathi
 Udaykumar
 K. S. Ashwath  
 Vanisri
 Jayasree
 Papamma
 Ramesh
 Narasimharaju
 Jr. Revathi
 Rama

Soundtrack

Awards
 1965 - Second Best Film in Kannada
 This film screened at IFFI 1992 Kannada cinema Retrospect.

References

External links 
 

1965 films
1960s Kannada-language films
Films directed by M. R. Vittal
Films scored by R. Sudarsanam